Extratime.ie, now using the domain Extratime.com and stylised as extratime is an Irish association football website, focussing on the League of Ireland. Edited by Gareth Penrose, it began in 2008.

The site maintains a register of Irish football players, carries out surveys of fans, and compiles attendance statistics.

Columnists
League of Ireland players and coaches have been featured columnists. These include:
Paul Corry, UCD AFC midfielder
Stephen Henderson, Cobh Ramblers manager 
Shane McFaul, St. Patrick's Athletic midfielder
Éamon Zayed, Bray Wanderers striker

References

External links

Irish sport websites
Irish news websites
English-language websites
Internet properties established in 2008